The Montgomery 15 is an American trailerable sailboat that was designed by Jerry Montgomery as a pocket cruiser and first built in 1980.

Production
The design was built by Montgomery Marine Products, Nor'Sea Yachts and Montgomery Boats in the United States, with 500 boats completed, but it is now out of production.

Design
The Montgomery 15 is a recreational keelboat, built predominantly of fiberglass, with simulated lapstrake construction molded in. It has a fractional sloop rig, a nearly plumb stem, a vertical transom, a transom-hung rudder controlled by a tiller and a fixed stub keel with a retractable centerboard. It displaces  and carries  of ballast.

The boat is normally fitted with a small  outboard motor for docking and maneuvering.

The design has sleeping accommodation for two people.

Operational history
In a 2010 review Steve Henkel wrote, "several hundred of these little boats were built and sold by Montgomery Marine over a period of 14 years, and in 1999 production recommenced, under the wing of Nor’Sea Yachts. Now the boats are being built under yet another name, Montgomery Boats. Best features: With her springy sheer and simulated lapstrake hull, she looks very graceful despite the relatively high freeboard ... Attention to detail in her construction is above average. Her ballast and displacement are high enough to give her good stability for a 15-footer. Worst features: She has the shallowest maximum draft (2' 6" with board down), making for somewhat poorer upwind performance compared to other comp[etitor]s, which all have drafts in the 3'to 4' range."

See also
List of sailing boat types

References

Keelboats
1980s sailboat type designs
Sailing yachts
Trailer sailers
Sailboat type designs by Jerry Montgomery
Sailboat types built by Montgomery Marine Products
Sailboat types built by Nor'Sea Yachts
Sailboat types built by Montgomery Boats